The Militi M.B.1 is an Italian single-seat flying-boat glider designed and built by Bruno Militi.

Design and development
Militi started to build his design for a flying-boat glider in October 1964 and it first flew on 13 August 1967. The M.B.1 is a parasol-wing monoplane with a two-step hull and a fuselage of aluminium alloy, wood and fibreglass. The mixed construction wing is supported by two N-struts in the centre and a vee-strut outboard on each side, it has plain ailerons but no flaps.  The pilot has an open cockpit with a small windscreen.  From 1969 Militi developed a powered version as the M.B.2 Leonardo which first flew in 1970.

Specifications

See also

References

Notes

Bibliography

1960s Italian sailplanes
Homebuilt aircraft
Flying boats
Glider aircraft
MB01
Parasol-wing aircraft
Aircraft first flown in 1967